Gary Hurlstone (born 25 April 1963) is an English former professional footballer who played as a striker in the Football League for York City, and in non-League football for Gainsborough Trinity, Worksop Town, Mexborough Town, Hatfield Main, Bridlington Town, Goole Town, Bishop Auckland, Buxton and Stocksbridge Park Steels.

References

1963 births
Living people
People from Mexborough
Footballers from Doncaster
English footballers
Association football forwards
Gainsborough Trinity F.C. players
Worksop Town F.C. players
Mexborough Town F.C. players
Hatfield Main F.C. players
York City F.C. players
Bridlington Town A.F.C. players
Goole Town F.C. players
Bishop Auckland F.C. players
Buxton F.C. players
Stocksbridge Park Steels F.C. players
English Football League players